Algarrobilla, small carob (algarrobo) in Spanish, also written algarovilla, may refer to :
 Balsamocarpon brevifolium, a plant species found in Chile
 Prosopis humilis, a flowering plant and a tree species found in Argentina
 Prosopis juliflora, the bayahonda blanca, a shrub or small tree species native to Mexico, South America and the Caribbean
 Prosopis nigra, the black carob tree, a leguminous tree species that inhabits the Gran Chaco ecoregion in Argentina and Paraguay
 Senna sophera, a plant in the genus Senna
 Pithecellobium parvifolium, a plant in the genus Pithecellobium

References

External links
 Algarrobilla on onlinedictionary.datasegment.com
 Algarrobilla on www.janaganamana.net

See also
 Algarrobina, a syrup made from the black carob tree